Bette is an American sitcom television series which premiered on October 11, 2000, on the CBS network. The show was the debut of Bette Midler in a lead TV series role. Sixteen episodes were aired on CBS, with its final telecast on March 7, 2001. Eighteen episodes in total were produced, with the final two only broadcast on HDTV simulcasting and in foreign markets. Bette was created by Jeffrey Lane, with Midler serving as one of the executive producers.

Synopsis
The sitcom had Midler playing herself – a "divine celebrity" who is adored by her fans. To apply some ambiguity, neither Bette's last name nor that of her on-screen family's was used, to create the offset that there was some difference between the star's real-life and TV persona. There were several similarities to Midler's actual career through the show's run, as the character of Bette had – and directly performed – many of the real-life Midler's past hit songs and achievements. The core of the stories focused on Bette's personal life in her luxurious Los Angeles home. Her husband of nearly 20 years, Roy (Kevin Dunn, eps. 1–12; Robert Hays, eps. 16–18) was an earnest college history professor, and their 13-year-old daughter, Rose (Lindsay Lohan, pilot episode; Marina Malota, eps. 2–18) was bright, active, and not the least bit fazed by her mother's celebrity. Embarking with Bette on her long, wild journey around showbiz was her hardworking best friend and manager Connie Randolph (Joanna Gleason). Refined Englishman Oscar (James Dreyfus) was Bette's veteran musical director/accompanist, who had an obsession with tabloid media and was always on the lookout for new, strange exploitations of Bette. During the series' run, slightly fictional Bette recorded a new album, engaged in hijinks at awards shows, won a Grammy, made guest roles on series such as JAG and Family Law (a cross promotion by CBS), and starred in a TV Halloween special with Dolly Parton (who appeared as herself and was said to be a longtime friend of the Bette character; Parton and Midler are friends in real life). Other stories were out of the spotlight and closer to home; in one, Bette volunteered at Rose's school with surprising results, and in another, flashbacks were shown depicting the first time Bette met Connie, Roy, and Oscar (in that order), along with one featuring the birth of Rose.

Cast
 Bette Midler as Bette
 Kevin Dunn (eps. 1–12) and Robert Hays (eps. 16–18) as Roy
 Lindsay Lohan (pilot) and Marina Malota (eps. 2–18) as Rose
 Joanna Gleason as Connie Randolph
 James Dreyfus as Oscar

Many of Midler's celebrity friends appeared as themselves during the show's short run. Guest stars included Danny DeVito, George Segal, Brenda Song, Sharon Lawrence, Tim Curry, David James Elliott, Oprah Winfrey, Ashley Tisdale, Tony Danza, Dolly Parton, Olivia Newton-John, Jon Lovitz, Kobe Bryant and the ladies from rival network ABC's The View all as themselves.

Production

Recasts
When Bette went into production, Lindsay Lohan was the original choice to play Rose. After the completion of the pilot episode, Midler decided that the series would shoot in Los Angeles, instead of New York City, where the pilot was filmed. 14-year-old Lohan did not want to continually commute from her family's current residence in New York City, due to the lengthy filming schedule for a TV series (typically 22 episodes per season). As a result, Marina Malota was cast in the role of Rose for the series' run. However the decision was made not to reshoot Lohan's scenes for the pilot episode with Malota in the role.

Several episodes into the series, Kevin Dunn grew unhappy with the increasingly minimal role and lack of development his character Roy was facing. After filming the series' 11th episode, CBS agreed to let Dunn out of his contract. Dunn was credited for one further episode for contractual reasons. The character of Roy was left offscreen for four episodes while the role was recast. Ultimately, Robert Hays was cast. In his first episode, A Brand New Roy, the cold open makes joking mention of the changes in Roy's appearance. Hays only filmed two episodes of Bette before its cancellation. One of his episodes - and another filmed before he was cast - were never aired by CBS, and his debut episode was the final to air on the network.

Cancellation
Although the series premiered to 15 million viewers in October 2000 - aided by prominently featured special guest stars in the early episodes - ratings dropped significantly by December. Midler was open about the challenges of adhering to a weekly television schedule, and was reported not to enjoy the daily process. By the time its 15th episode aired in February 2001, the series was averaging 9 million viewers. CBS officially cancelled the series on March 6, with the 16th episode airing the following day. Two additional episodes had been completed, and would air in foreign markets.

Episodes

Broadcast

United States

16 of the 18 filmed episodes aired Wednesday nights until its cancellation. Originally in the 8pm time slot, Bette was moved to 8:30/7:30c in February 2001 and aired only a few more times. Two episodes went unaired on network TV, but aired in HDTV in which it was simulcast.

International
In Australia, Bette was shown on Network Ten in prime-time on Sunday nights beginning in January 2001. Bette aired in Canada on OUT-TV on Saturday Nights in 2020. All 18 episodes aired during this run. As of April 2022, the entire series is streaming in Canada on CTV.

Ratings

Awards
Golden Globe (2001) – Nominated – "Best Performance by an Actress in a TV-Series – Comedy/Musical" – Bette Midler
People's Choice Awards (2001) – Won – "Favorite Female Performer in a New Television Series" – Bette Midler
TV Guide Awards (2001) – Won – "Actress of the Year in a New Series" – Bette Midler
TV Guide Awards (2001) – Nominated – "New Series of the Year"
Primetime Emmy Award (2001) – Nominated – "Outstanding Art Direction for a Multi-Camera Series" – Bernard Vyzga (production designer) & Lynda Burbank (set decorator) for the pilot
Excellence in Production Design Award Television – Won – "Episode of a Multi-Camera Series" – Bernard Vyzga (production designer) & Rich Rohrer (assistant art director) for the pilot

References

External links
  (archived)
 

2000s American sitcoms
2000 American television series debuts
2001 American television series endings
CBS original programming
English-language television shows
Television series by CBS Studios
Television series by Sony Pictures Television
Television shows set in Los Angeles
Television shows scored by Alf Clausen